Petrovsk-Zabaykalsky District is an administrative district (raion), one of the thirty-one in Zabaykalsky Krai, Russia. It is located in the southwest of the krai, and borders Khiloksky District in the east, Krasnochikoysky District in the south, and Bichursky District, Kizhinginsky District, Mukhorshibirsky District, Zaigrayevsky District of the Republic of Buryatia in the west and north. Its administrative center is the town of Petrovsk-Zabaykalsky. As of the 2010 Census, the total population of the district was 37,900, with the population of the administrative center accounting for 48.9% of that number.

History
The district was established on January 4, 1926.

Administrative and municipal status
Within the framework of administrative divisions, Petrovsk-Zabaykalsky District is one of the thirty-one in the krai. The town of Petrovsk-Zabaykalsky serves as its administrative center.

As a municipal division, the territory of the district is split between two municipal formations—Petrovsk-Zabaykalsky Municipal District, to which three urban-type settlements and twenty-two of the administrative district's rural localities belong, and Petrovsk-Zabaykalsky Urban Okrug, which covers the rest of the administrative district's territory, including the town of Petrovsk-Zabaykalsky.

References

Notes

Sources

Districts of Zabaykalsky Krai
States and territories established in 1926